Correbia is a genus of moths in the subfamily Arctiinae. The genus was erected by Gottlieb August Wilhelm Herrich-Schäffer in 1855.

Species
Correbia affinis (Druce, 1884)
Correbia agnonides (Druce, 1884)
Correbia bricenoi Rothschild, 1912
Correbia elegans
Correbia elongatus (Dognin, 1890)
Correbia euryptera Dognin, 1916
Correbia felderi Rothschild, 1912
Correbia flavata Druce, 1909
Correbia fulvescens Dognin, 1913
Correbia lycoides (Walker, 1854)
Correbia meridionalis Rothschild, 1912
Correbia minima Druce, 1905
Correbia negrona Draudt, 1917
Correbia oberthuri Hampson, 1898
Correbia obscura Schaus, 1905
Correbia obtusa (Druce, 1884)
Correbia punctigera Gaede, 1926
Correbia raca (Druce, 1896)
Correbia rufescens Rothschild, 1912
Correbia semitransversa Schaus, 1911
Correbia tristitia Kaye, 1911
Correbia undulata (Druce, 1884)

References

External links

"Correiba". Encyclopedia of Life.

Euchromiina
Moth genera